Bikram Singh Jaryal (born 14 May 1961) is a political leader associated with Bhartiya Janta Party. He served as the Member of Legislative Assembly representing Bhattiyat Constituency in Chamba District in Himachal Pradesh and Chief Whip of Himachal Pradesh Government.

Early life and education

Personal life

Political career

References 

Living people
1961 births
Bharatiya Janata Party politicians from Himachal Pradesh